Ghulam Osman Yaghma (born 16 August 1956 in Atush, East Turkistan (Xinjiang) is a Canadian Uyghur politician, independence leader, writer, and poet who serves as  the President of the East Turkistan Government-in-Exile.

Early life
Ghulam Osman Yaghma was born in the city of Atush, Xinjiang. Upon finishing high school, he was barred from obtaining post-secondary education by the Chinese government due to his past participation in creating a independence organization "to liberate East Turkistan from Chinese occupation". He served as an instructor of modern Uyghur language, literature and estelistics.

Life in exile

Yaghma fled East Turkistan (Xinjiang) to Kyrgyzstan on 30 April 1996, two days after China launched its "Strike Hard campaign" against separatism. He later fled Central Asia to Turkey in 1999 after he was not permitted to stay in Central Asia. In Turkey he appealed to the United Nations High Commission for Refugees office in Turkey and after three years, in March 2002, Yaghma was given asylum in Canada. Yaghma is fluent in Uyghur and Turkish, and proficient in English and Chinese. He is married and has 8 children, two of which are allegedly incarcerated in the Xinjiang re-education camps. He resides in Edmonton, Canada.

East Turkistan Government in Exile
Ghulam Osman Yaghma was re-elected as the President of the East Turkistan Government-in-Exile on 11 November 2019 at the government in exile's 8th General Assembly in Washington, DC. He had previously been elected president following the impeachment of the former president in a Special Parliamentary Session in Mugla, Turkey in October 2018. He is the third President of the government in exile since its formation in 2004. Starting in 2009, he had previously served as the Strategic Advisor to the East Turkistan Government-in-Exile. He was elected as the Deputy Prime Minister of the East Turkistan Government-in-Exile at the 7th General Assembly held in Tokyo, Japan from 12 November to 15 November.

Literary works
Ghulam Osman Yaghma, using the pen name "G.O. Zulpiqar" has authored numerous non-fiction books, novels, articles, and poems. "Lost Treasure", "He Is Still in Battle", "Secret Love", "Dulled Sword", "Sound", "Sigh", "The road leads to heaven", "Infatuation" and "Reflection" are among the most read fiction novels written by him. Some of his numerous political orientated books include "Exploring on the Path of East Turkistan Liberation" (3 volumes), "Mirror", and "Tears of East Turkistan" along with three poetic books, and hundreds of video speech and lectures.. He plans on publishing new books: "Heroic Age" (Novel), "Mirage", "Foam", "Letters that Have Not Been Sent."

References

External links 
Ghulam Osman Yaghma on Twitter
A Muslim Divide in China (Radio Free Asia, 2012; comments about Hui and Uyghur experiences in China)

Canadian people of Uyghur descent
East Turkestan independence activists
Uyghur politicians
1956 births
Living people